Neaspilota callistigma is a species of tephritid or fruit flies in the genus Neaspilota of the family Tephritidae.

Distribution
Mexico, United States.

References

Tephritinae
Insects described in 1986
Diptera of North America